Sam Dakin OLY (born 1996) is a New Zealand track cyclist, who competes in sprinting events.

Born in Auckland, Dakin completed a Bachelor of Business Analysis with a major in Finance in Waikato and also completed a Post Graduate Diploma in Innovation and entrepreneurship in 2020 online through Harvard University. His training base is the Avantidrome in Cambridge as part of the New Zealand High Performance Squad. He was selected for the New Zealand Olympic team for the 2020 Summer Olympics in Tokyo. Dakin competed in the team sprint event following the retirement of Eddie Dawkins, joining three-time World Champions and Rio 2016 silver medalists, Ethan Mitchell and Sam Webster.

References

Living people
1996 births
New Zealand male cyclists
Cyclists from Auckland
Cyclists at the 2020 Summer Olympics
Olympic cyclists of New Zealand
Cyclists at the 2022 Commonwealth Games
Commonwealth Games competitors for New Zealand
Commonwealth Games bronze medallists for New Zealand
Commonwealth Games medallists in cycling
20th-century New Zealand people
21st-century New Zealand people
Medallists at the 2022 Commonwealth Games